Tom Carson (born 29 June 1990) is an English international field hockey player who played as a forward for England and Great Britain.

Carson plays club hockey in the Men's England Hockey League Premier Division for Old Georgians.

He played for Beerschot in Belgium during the 2018–19 season. He played for 6 years, including 2 years as captain for Reading in the Men's England Hockey League Premier Division.

Carson also played for University of Exeter. His younger brother James has represented Wales in international hockey. He is the oldest of four brothers, all of whom attended Wellington School, Somerset, where their father was a boarding housemaster.

He is also a founder of YoungOnes Apparel, a fashion company which began by making and selling onesies. He started the company while he was a student at the University of Exeter. He appeared on an episode of Dragons' Den, where they were offered £75,000 by Duncan Bannatyne, which they ultimately turned down.

References

1990 births
Living people
English male field hockey players
Reading Hockey Club players
Men's England Hockey League players
Royal Beerschot THC players
Men's Belgian Hockey League players
2014 Men's Hockey World Cup players